Żerniki may refer to the following places:
Żerniki, Cuiavian-Pomeranian Voivodeship (north-central Poland)
Żerniki, Inowrocław County (south Cuiavian-Pomeranian Voivodeship)
Żerniki, Żnin County (west Cuiavian-Pomeranian Voivodeship)
Żerniki, Łódź Voivodeship (central Poland)
Żerniki, Lublin Voivodeship (east Poland)
Żerniki, Świętokrzyskie Voivodeship (south-central Poland)
Żerniki, Jędrzejów County (west-central Świętokrzyskie Voivodeship)
Żerniki, Opatów County (east-central Świętokrzyskie Voivodeship)
Żerniki Dolne, Busko County (south Świętokrzyskie Voivodeship)
Żerniki Górne, Busko County  (south Świętokrzyskie Voivodeship)
Żerniki, Masovian Voivodeship (east-central Poland)
Żerniki, Greater Poland Voivodeship (west-central Poland)
Żerniki, Jarocin County (south-central Greater Poland Voivodeship)
Żerniki, Kalisz County (south-east Greater Poland Voivodeship)
Żerniki, Oborniki County (north-central Greater Poland Voivodeship)
Żerniki, Poznań County (central Greater Poland Voivodeship)
Żerniki, Września County (east Greater Poland Voivodeship)
Żerniki, Lower Silesian Voivodeship (south-west Poland)
 Żerniki, Wrocław, neighbourhood in Fabryczna, Wrocław
 Żerniki Małe
 Żerniki Wielkie
 Żerniki Wrocławskie
Żerniki, Gliwice, neighbourhood in  Gliwice, Silesian Voivodeship (south Poland)